The Van Buren Public Schools (VBPS) is a school district headquartered in Belleville, Michigan.

Schools

Secondary schools

 Belleville High School (Belleville)
 McBride Middle School (formerly North Middle School, Van Buren Township)
 Owen Intermediate School (formerly South Middle School, Belleville)

Primary schools
Edgemont Elementary School (Belleville)
Rawsonville Elementary School (Ypsilanti Township)
Savage Elementary School (Van Buren Township)
Tyler Elementary School (Van Buren Township)

Early childhood centers
Haggerty School (formerly Haggerty Elementary School, Van Buren Township)

Defunct schools
Elwell Elementary School (Sumpter Township) - This school has been razed.
Denton Elementary School (Van Buren Township) - This school has been razed.
Quirk Road Elementary School (Van Buren Township) - This school has been razed.
Early Childhood Development Center (Belleville - Outbuilding of Edgemont Elementary site) - This building has been razed. 
West Willow Elementary School (Ypsilanti Township, Michigan)<ref>"

References

External links

 Van Buren Public Schools

Education in Wayne County, Michigan
Education in Washtenaw County, Michigan

School districts in Michigan